Lake of Flatschach is an Austrian lake at Flatschach near Feldkirchen in Kärnten in  the  State of Carinthia.

Description 
Since its inflow passes through a region which is heavily used for agriculture, the lake is heavily contaminated with nutrients. The lake itself is located in the  protected area of 'Flatschacher See'.

Fauna  
The following species of fish are found in Lake Flatschacher: Carassius carassius, Carp, Cyprinus carpio, common rudd, Rutilus rutilus and Sander lucioperca.

Notes

Links  
 Flatschacher See (Kärntner Institut für Seenforschung) (in German)

Lakes of Carinthia (state)